Anna Evseeva is a road cyclist from Russia. She represented her nation at the 2009 UCI Road World Championships.

References

External links
 profile at Procyclingstats.com

Russian female cyclists
Living people
Place of birth missing (living people)
Year of birth missing (living people)